Beauty Crown Grand Theater is an indoor arena or theater in seven-star Beauty Crown Hotel Complex in the tropical city of Sanya, Hainan Island, China, and it is currently one of the biggest arena or theater for arts and entertainment venues, which stands 36 meters high and covers about 10,000 square meters, and was built in 2003. Located in the city center, the crown-shaped Beauty Crown Theatre or Crown of Beauty Theatre was specially built for the Miss World pageant in 2003. The 3,500-seat theater is equipped with an up-to-date and high-tech audio and lightning system. It hosted 6 Miss World events: Miss World 2003, Miss World 2004, Miss World 2005, Miss World 2007, Miss World 2010, and Miss World 2015.

External links
 Beauty Crown Hotel official website
 Miss World Organization official website
 Venue information

Notes and references
Notes

Sources
Beauty Crown Hotel Complex Website

Theatres in China
Buildings and structures in Hainan
Tourist attractions in Sanya
Sanya